Antennatus rosaceus, known as the spiny-tufted frogfish, is a species of fish in the family Antennariidae. It is native to the Indo-Pacific, where it is known from the Red Sea, Indonesia, the Philippines, the Gilbert Islands, the Marshall Islands, and Lord Howe Island. It occurs at a depth range of 0 to 130 m (0 to 427 ft), although it is most commonly found at 30 to 40 m (98 to 131 ft), where it is often seen near sponges. It is a small, reef-dwelling, benthic fish, reaching 5.8 cm (2.3 inches) SL.

References 

Myers, R.F., 1991. Micronesian reef fishes. Second Ed. Coral Graphics, Barrigada, Guam. 298 p.

Antennariidae
Taxa named by Hugh McCormick Smith
Taxa named by Lewis Radcliffe
Fish of the Pacific Ocean